Dicepolia roseobrunnea is a moth in the family Crambidae. It was described by Warren in 1889. It is found from central and northern Bolivia and south-eastern Peru to north-eastern Brazil, from the Pantanal to the coastal range of the northern Andes, Trinidad, Guyana, Suriname and French Guiana. It has also been recorded from Honduras.

The length of the forewings is 7.2–10.3 mm. The forewings vary from pale brown to orange brown and brownish red. The costa and lines are brown. The hindwings vary from lustrous white to very pale bronze. The terminal area is suffused with brown between the veins and there are rosy scales along the distal veins. Adults have been recorded on wing from January to May, July to August and October to December.

The larvae feed on Licania species. They bore into the fruit of their host plant, feeding on the seed and later the flesh. A single larva feeds on multiple fruits. Young larvae are about 2 mm long with cream body and brown head. Pupation takes place inside the fruit, on a branch, on bark or under loose bark.

References

Moths described in 1889
Odontiinae